Israel Pollak (1909–1993) was an Austro-Hungarian-born Romanian, Chilean and Israeli textile industrialist. He is best known for founding the Israel-based Polgat company.

Biography
Israel Pollak was born to a Jewish Orthodox family in Borșa, east Maramureș. In 1925, he moved to Gura Humorului, Bukovina, and later to Cernăuți. While in Cernăuți he studied at yeshiva and at a textile plant. In 1935, he founded an enterprise of its kind in the city.

Business career
After World War II, he emigrated to Chile where his brother Marcos had emigrated before the war. There with his brothers and brothers-in-laws he founded the "Pollak Hnos." textile company. In 1960, Pinhas Sapir, then Israel's Minister of Industry, invited Pollak to make aliyah and to establish a textile plant in Kiryat Gat. The Pollak's new company, Polgat, grew into the largest textile, clothing and knitwear company in Israel. It eventually became a public corporation whose shares were traded on the Tel Aviv Stock Exchange. In 1970, the Pollaks founded Bagir, a men's division for suits and jackets.

Awards and recognition
In 1990, Pollak was awarded the Israel Prize for his special contribution to society and the State of Israel.

In 1992, he was honored by the Hebrew University in Jerusalem.

In 1993, he was honored by the Technion in Haifa.

See also
 Israeli fashion
 List of Israel Prize recipients

References

1909 births
1993 deaths
20th-century Chilean businesspeople
Chilean Jews
Israel Prize for special contribution to society and the State recipients
20th-century Israeli businesspeople
20th-century Israeli Jews
Israeli people of Romanian-Jewish descent
Chilean emigrants to Israel
People from Borșa
20th-century Romanian businesspeople
Romanian emigrants to Chile
Romanian Jews